The Free State Stadium, currently known as the Toyota Stadium for sponsorship reasons and formerly known as Vodacom Park, is a stadium in Bloemfontein, South Africa, used mainly for rugby union and also sometimes for association football. It was originally built for the 1995 Rugby World Cup, and was one of the venues for the 2010 FIFA World Cup.

The primary rugby union tenants of the facility are:
 The Cheetahs, which represents Free State and Northern Cape provinces in the international Pro14 competition.
 The Free State Cheetahs, which participate in South Africa's domestic competition, the Currie Cup.

The primary association football tenant is:
 Bloemfontein Celtic, who play in South Africa's domestic Premier Soccer League.

Notable matches

1995 Rugby World Cup 
The stadium was one of the host venues for the 1995 Rugby World Cup. It hosted first round matches in Pool C during the tournament.

1996 African Cup of Nations 

The Free State Stadium was one of venues used for the 1996 African Cup of Nations. It hosted six group matches and a quarter-final match:

2009 FIFA Confederations Cup 
The Free State Stadium was one of the host venues for the 2009 FIFA Confederations Cup.

2010 FIFA World Cup 

In advance of the 2010 FIFA World Cup, a second tier was added to the main grandstand on the western side of the ground, increasing the net capacity from 36,538 to 40,911. Additionally, new turnstiles were created, the floodlights upgraded, electronic scoreboards installed, the sound system revamped to the required standards, and CCTV and media facilities improved.

Bloemfontein received R221 million to upgrade the stadium. Though cost estimates were at R245 million, the city decided to stand in for the R24m shortfall. Tenders were advertised in February & March 2007. Upgrade work started in July 2007.

See also 

 List of stadiums in South Africa
 List of African stadiums by capacity

References

External links 

 Bloemfontein: Official municipality website
Photos of Stadiums in South Africa at cafe.daum.net/stade
 360 View

Soccer venues in South Africa
Rugby union stadiums in South Africa
Rugby World Cup stadiums
2010 FIFA World Cup stadiums
2009 FIFA Confederations Cup stadiums
Buildings and structures in Bloemfontein
Sports venues in the Free State (province)
Sports venues completed in 1995